Peebles Castle was a 12th-century castle built near Peebles, Scotland. Peebles was created a royal burgh by King David I of Scotland in the 12th century. The castle, once a royal castle, was built as a motte-and-bailey castle. Nothing remains above ground.

Citations

References

Castles in the Scottish Borders
Former castles in Scotland
Demolished buildings and structures in Scotland
Peebles